MV or HSC Saint John Paul II is a high-speed catamaran ferry owned and operated by Virtu Ferries. Built by Incat in 2017–18, the vessel entered service as a ferry between Malta and Sicily in March 2019. It is the largest vessel of its kind in the Mediterranean Sea, and the second largest in the world.

Description
The vessel consists of two aluminium hulls connected by a bridging section, with the forward end containing a central bow structure.

The catamaran's main engines are four MTU 20V 8000 M71L engines. It is propelled by four Wärtsilä LJX 1500SR waterjets.

The vessel is designed to accommodate 1,120 passengers and 24 crew. It has two deck levels and the vessel's vehicle capacity is 490 truck lane metres or 167 cars.

Construction
Virtu Ferries ordered the catamaran in July 2016 at a cost of 75 million euros in order to provide for an increased capacity of cargo traffic and passengers between Malta and Sicily. In 2017 it was announced that the vessel would be named Saint John Paul II, after Pope John Paul II, who had traveled on a Virtu Ferries catamaran, the ACC San Frangisk, during his 1990 visit to Malta. The vessel was built in accordance with DNV GL Classification Society Rules and with IMO High Speed Craft HSC 2000, along with Malta Flag statutory requirements and Italian Port State requirements.

The catamaran was built as Hull 089 by Incat in Hobart, Tasmania, and it was designed by Revolution Design and Seaspeed Marine Consulting and tank-tested at Qinetiq. Construction began in 2017, and the vessel was launched on 22 December 2018. Sea trials began in January 2019, and the vessel was handed over to Virtu Ferries on 24 January. It was delivered to Malta in a two-week journey between 6 and 27 February 2019.

Career

The vessel entered service in March 2019, replacing the Jean de La Valette. An open day was held on 10 March 2019, and 9,000 people visited the vessel. MaltaPost installed a mailbox on board the catamaran on 11 March 2019, and mail posted there is marked as paquebot.

The vessel has been called a "significant ship" by the Royal Institution of Naval Architects.

During the COVID-19 pandemic in both Italy and Malta, the catamaran is still operating according to schedule but only commercial vehicles and their drivers are allowed on board. A limited number of repatriation trips allowing passengers to return to their home countries were organised in March 2020.

Notes

References

External links
 General arrangement drawings of the MV Saint John Paul II
 

2018 ships
Incat high-speed craft
Individual catamarans
Ferries of Malta
Pope John Paul II
Ferries of Italy
Virtu Ferries